NM, nm, and variations may refer to:

Businesses and organizations 
 Northwestern Mutual, financial services company in Wisconsin, United States 
 Air Madrid (IATA airline designator NM), Spanish airline
 Mount Cook Airline (IATA airline designator NM), New Zealand airline 
 Manx2 (IATA airline designator NM), Isle of Man airline

Places 
 The National Mall in Washington, D.C., United States
 Navi Mumbai, India
 New Mexico, a state of the United States (postal abbreviation)
 Inner Mongolia, an autonomous region of China (Guobiao abbreviation and ISO-3166-2:CN code NM)

Science and technology

Medicine 
 Nemaline myopathy, a neuromuscular disorder
 Neuromelanin, a dark pigment found in the brain
 Nuclear medicine, a medical imaging modality

Units of measure 
 Nanometer (nm), an SI unit of length, equal to 10−9 m (a thousand-millionth of a meter)
 Nanomolar (nM), in chemistry, one thousand-millionth molar
 Nautical mile (NM or nmi), a unit of length used for maritime and aviation purposes
 Newton metre (Nm, may also be written as N·m), a unit of torque
 Normal cubic metre (Nm3), a unit of volume (normal referring to standard temperature and pressure)
 Normalizovaný muštomer (°NM), a scale of wine must density
 Number metric, a measure of linear density of fibers in textiles

Other uses in science and technology 
 nm (Unix), a computer program used as an aid for debugging

 NM, nonmetallic-sheathed electrical cable (in North America), nowadays typically thermoplastic-sheathed cable

 Noise margin, the amount by which a signal exceeds the minimum amount for proper operation

Other uses 
 Never mind, or nothing much or not much in Internet slang
 Namma Metro, a rapid transit line in Bangalore, India
 Nao Sena Medal, a gallantry award for servicemen in the Indian Navy
 National monument
 National monument (United States)
 National Master, a chess title